General Reynolds may refer to:

Alexander W. Reynolds (1816/17–1876), Confederate States Army brigadier general
Daniel H. Reynolds (1832–1902), Confederate States Army brigadier general
Francisco Reynolds (1852–1923), Argentine Army general
Gavan Reynolds (fl. 1980s–2020s), Australian Army lieutenant general
John Reynolds (Illinois politician) (1788–1865), Illinois militia major general during the Black Hawk War
John F. Reynolds (1820–1863), Union Army major general 
Jon A. Reynolds (fl. 1950s–2000s), U.S. Air Force brigadier general
Joseph Reynolds (congressman) (1785–1864), New York state militia brigadier general during the War of 1812
Joseph J. Reynolds (1822–1899), Union Army major general 
Loretta Reynolds (fl. 1980s–2020s), U.S. Marine Corps lieutenant general
Royal Reynolds Jr. (1910–2003), U.S. Army brigadier general
Russel Burton Reynolds (1894–), U.S. Army major general

See also
Attorney General Reynolds (disambiguation)